Bletchington railway station is a disused station in Oxfordshire at Enslow, England, a hamlet  west of the village of Bletchingdon. The station had a number of names during its period of operation: 'Woodstock', 'Woodstock Road', 'Kirtlington' and finally 'Bletchington'.

History
The Oxford and Rugby Railway planned a railway between those two points, which was authorised on 4 August 1845; construction began in 1846, but before any portion was open, it was absorbed by the Great Western Railway. Upon the opening of a different station named Woodstock Road in 1855, this station was renamed Kirtlington; and following rebuilding it was renamed for a final time on 11 August 1890, becoming Bletchington. It is possible that the original name of this station was Woodstock, becoming Woodstock Road in May 1851 or 1852.

British Railways closed the station to passengers on 2 November 1964 and to goods on 21 June 1965. The station building survives but much of the station site is now occupied by an industrial estate.

Notes

References

External links
 Station and Line on navigable 1947 O.S. map
 Photograph of station site today

Disused railway stations in Oxfordshire
Former Great Western Railway stations
Railway stations in Great Britain opened in 1850
Railway stations in Great Britain closed in 1964
Beeching closures in England
1852 establishments in England